The General Cemetery of Santa Cruz is a public cemetery located in Santa Cruz de la Sierra, Bolivia. Located on Viedma Avenue and surrounded by Arenales, Paitití and Salvatierra Streets, it is one of the municipal administration cemeteries.

History
The General Cemetery was established during the presidency of Andrés de Santa Cruz, according to D.S. of 1826, which establishes the implementation of cemeteries throughout Bolivia. It began to be used in 1834 and houses the burial site of Andrés Ibáñez. It was declared a heritage site in 2013.

Characteristics
The General Cemetery is the oldest official cemetery in the city, there are currently close to 50 spaces between regulated and spontaneous settlement established in the city. The General Cemetery stands out for hosting the graves of the first Santa Cruz families as well as for the beauty of its mausoleums, walks and trails.

Notable internments
 Hugo Banzer (1926–2002), military officer and politician, President of Bolivia (1971–1978, 1997–2002)
 Dr. Andrés Ibáñez (1844–1877), politician

References

External links
 

Cemeteries in Bolivia
Buildings and structures in Santa Cruz de la Sierra